Robert John Alston,  (born 10 February 1938) is a retired British diplomat.

Alston was educated at Ardingly College and New College, Oxford. He is Chairman of Governors at Ardingly College. He served as British Ambassador to Oman between (1986–1990), and as British High Commissioner to New Zealand and the Cook Islands, non-resident High Commissioner to Samoa, and Governor of the Pitcairn Islands between (1994–1998).

In 2007-08 he was Master of the Worshipful Company of World Traders, one of the City of London's 110 livery companies.

Honours
  Companion of the Order of St Michael and St George (CMG) - 1987

References

1938 births
Living people
People educated at Ardingly College
Alumni of New College, Oxford
Companions of the Order of St Michael and St George
Companions of the Queen's Service Order
Deputy Lieutenants of Kent
High Commissioners of the United Kingdom to New Zealand
High Commissioners of the United Kingdom to the Cook Islands
High Commissioners of the United Kingdom to Samoa
Governors of Pitcairn
Ambassadors of the United Kingdom to Oman